The black-throated barbet (Tricholaema melanocephala) is a species of bird in the Lybiidae family.  It is found in Djibouti, Eritrea, Ethiopia, Kenya, Somalia, South Sudan, Tanzania, and Uganda.

References

black-throated barbet
Birds of the Horn of Africa
black-throated barbet
Taxonomy articles created by Polbot
black-throated barbet